Bernhard Georg Jacob Hanssen (1844–1911) was a German architect and politician.

Life and work 
After completing an apprenticeship as a carpenter, he studied architecture in Karlsruhe (1863–64) and Stuttgart (1865). Following that, he worked as a site manager for Christian Friedrich von Leins, who was engaged in restoring rural churches. He then studied for an additional two years in Berlin while working part time for several architectural firms. From 1870, he was in Hamburg where he was employed by an engineer named Schmetzer; until 1873, when he and an old friend from Karlsruhe, Wilhelm Emil Meerwein, began their own architectural practice.

Since 2008, it has been the home of the International Maritime Museum.

At that time, he joined the "Rathausbaumeisterbund", a group of architects, organized in 1885 by Martin Haller, who had been appointed to create the new Hamburg City Hall; a project that lasted from 1886 to 1897.

In 1901, Meerwein was elected to the Hamburg Parliament and devoted most of his time to it so, when Hanssen's health began to decline in 1905, he retired and closed their firm. He died six years later in the resort city of Travemünde.

A street in Hamburg's Winterhude district is named after him.

References

Further reading 
 Jan Lubitz: "Hanssen, Bernhard". In: Franklin Kopitzsch, Dirk Brietzke (Eds.): Hamburgische Biografie. Vol. 5. Wallstein, Göttingen 2010, pp. 170–171.
 Wie die Stadtbaumeister von einst das Kunstwerk Hamburg schufen (How the city architects of yore created the work of art, Hamburg) In: Die Welt, 24 June 2006

External links 

 Informationen Kaispeicher B @ Geschichtsspuren
 Historic Pictures of Kaispeicher B
 Historic Pictures of Hamburg City Hall

1844 births
1911 deaths
19th-century German architects
Members of the Hamburg Parliament
Architects from Hamburg